Ange is a French masculine given name and a nickname. It may refer to:

Given name
 Ange Armato (born 1929), American baseball player in the All-American Girls Professional Baseball League
 Ange de Grimoard (circa 1315–1388), French cardinal
 Ange Diawara (1941–1973), Republic of the Congo politician
  (1846–1927), French composer
 Ange Auguste Joseph de Laborde de Boutervilliers (1766–1786), French explorer
 Ange Leccia (born 1952), French painter, photographer and filmmaker
 Ange Mancini (born 1944), French politician
 Ange Nanizayamo (born 1998), French footballer
 Ange N'Guessan (born 1990), Ivorian footballer
 Ange McCormack (born 1996 or 1997), Australian journalist and radio presenter
 Ange Postecoglou (born 1965), Australian football coach and former player
 Ange Édouard Poungui (born 1942), Prime Minister of the Republic of the Congo
 Ange de Saint Joseph (1636–1697), French missionary friar
 Ange de Sainte-Rosalie (1655–1726), French genealogist

Nickname
 Angelus de Baets (1793–1855), French painter
 Evangelos Goussis (born 1967), Australian boxer, kickboxer and murderer

See also
 Angelo Lonardo (1911–2006), American mobster nicknamed "Big Ange"

French masculine given names
Lists of people by nickname